Melia dubia (Tamil / தமிழ்: malai vembu / மலை வேம்பு, Kannada: hebbevu or kaadu bevu) is  a tree in the family Meliaceae. It is distributed all throughout India (with the exception of Jammu & Kashmir, Himachal Pradesh, Sikkim), the Malay Peninsula and tropical Asia. It is present in moist deciduous, evergreen and semi-evergreen forests. It leaves fall from February to May, flowers January to March and fruits from November to February.

References

dubia
Taxa named by Antonio José Cavanilles